Proutia is a genus of moths belonging to the family Psychidae.

The genus was first described by Tutt in 1899.

The species of this genus are found in Europe, Japan and Northern America.

Species:
 Proutia norvegica (Heylaerts, 1882)

References

Psychidae
Psychidae genera